The People's Pioneer Party (abbr. PPP) is a political party in Myanmar. More than half of the party's 19 founders are businessmen. They include U Myint, a former economic adviser to the Thein Sein's Cabinet; Zaw Oo, an economist who also serves as the party's economic and policy adviser; and Thet Thet Khaing, former member of the Pyithu Hluttaw for Dagon Township who resigned from the National League for Democracy.

The party's founders claimed that a majority of Myanmar's business community was involved in founding the party to help revive the country's declining economy. The People's Pioneer Party ran more than 230 candidates in 11 regions and states in the 2020 general election but won none of the seats. Many members of the party are former military personnel and those with ties to the ultranationalist organisation Ma Ba Tha. In fact, Thet Thet Khaing was one of the sponsors for Ma Ba Tha's third anniversary conference in 2016 and made donations to Insein Ywama Sayadaw, former chairman of Ma Ba Tha, during her election campaign in 2020.

History 
Thet Thet Khaing was expelled from the Dagon Township Township Executive Committee of the NLD in November 2018 for allegedly publicly criticizing the NLD through the media. In late 2019, Thet Thet Khaing officially resigned from the NLD and founded the People's Pioneer Party.

The People's Pioneer Party was officially registered as a political party on 23 October 2019 by the Union Election Commission. Kyaw Zeya, a member of the Yangon Region Hluttaw and a frequent critic of the Yangon Region Government, joined the PPP on 25 January 2020, after being officially expelled from the NLD.

Structure 
 Chairman – Thet Thet Khaing
 Vice Chairmen – Kyaw Zeya and Myint Maung Tun
 General Secretary – Saw Han Aye

References 

Political parties established in 2019
Political parties in Myanmar
Right-wing politics in Myanmar
Far-right
Myanmar
Myanmar
Far-right politics in Myanmar